The Diocese of Bjørgvin is one of the 11 dioceses that make up the Church of Norway. It includes all of the churches located in the county of Vestland in Western Norway. The cathedral city is Bergen, Norway's second largest city. Bergen Cathedral, formerly the Church of Saint Olaf, serves as the seat of the presiding Bishop. The Bishop since 2023 has been Ragnhild Jepsen.

History

Prior to 1536, the state religion of Norway was Roman Catholicism, but the government of the Kingdom of Denmark-Norway joined in with the Protestant Reformation and in 1536 it declared itself to be Lutheran, and the Church of Norway was formed.  In 1537, the diocese of Bjørgvin consisted of the (modern) counties of Hordaland and Sogn og Fjordane (with exception of the parishes of Eidfjord and Røldal).

The region of Sunnmøre (to the north) was transferred from the Diocese of Nidaros to the Diocese of Bjørgvin in 1622. The parish of Eidfjord was transferred from the Diocese of Stavanger to Bjørgvin in 1630. The parish of Røldal was transferred from the Diocese of Kristiansand to Bjørgvin in 1863. The Sunnmøre region was removed from the Diocese of Bjørgvin in 1983 when it, along with the regions of Nordmøre and Romsdal (from the Diocese of Nidaros), were established as a separate diocese, the Diocese of Møre.

Name
The Old Norse form of the name for Bergen was Bjǫrgvin. The first element is berg or bjǫrg, which translates as "mountain". The last element is vin, which translates as "meadow".  It is an old form of the name for the present-day city of Bergen.

Structure
The Diocese of Bjørgvin is divided into ten deaneries in the new Vestland county.  Each deanery corresponds to one or more municipalities in the diocese.  Each municipality is further divided into one or more parishes which each contain one or more congregations.  See each municipality below for lists of churches and parishes within them.

Bishops

References

Church of Norway dioceses
Organisations based in Bergen
Vestland